Hathloul bin Abdulaziz Al Saud (1941 29 September 2012) was a senior prince of the House of Saud, and a member of the Kingdom of Saudi Arabia's Allegiance Council.

Early life
Prince Hathloul was born in Riyadh in 1941. He was King Abdulaziz's thirty-second son. His mother was a Yemeni woman, Saida al Yamaniyah, and a concubine of the King.

Succession and activities
Prince Hathloul was a businessman and vice chair of the Najd corporation.

In August 2009 the Washington Institute for Near East Policy identified him as a potential successor to King Abdullah of Saudi Arabia. In 2012, Foreign Policy cited him as one of four potential heirs apparent after Crown Prince Salman bin Abdulaziz, adding that Prince Hathloul was much less well-known than the other three candidates.

Prince Hathloul served as president of Al-Hilal FC three times.

Family

In 2017 his son, Turki bin Hathloul, was named deputy governor of Najran province.

Death
In a statement by the Royal Court it was announced that Prince Hathloul had died abroad on 29 September 2012. His body was taken to Jeddah on 30 September 2012. Funeral prayers for him were held on the same day at the Grand Mosque in Mecca.

King Hamad bin Isa Al Khalifa and Bahraini Prime Minister Prince Khalifa bin Salman Al Khalifa sent a cable of condolences to King Abdullah bin Abdulaziz Al Saud and Crown Prince Salman bin Abdulaziz Al Saud on the demise of Prince Hathloul bin Abdulaziz Al Saud.

Ancestry

References

Hathloul
Hathloul
1941 births
2012 deaths
Hathloul
Hathloul
Hathloul
Hathloul